Albin Savola (26 July 1867, Sulkava - 8 December 1934, Forssa) was a Finnish priest and missionary, who served as one of the first Finnish missionaries in Ovamboland and published literature in the Oshindonga language.

Life stages
Savola was born in Sulkava Kaipola village in a miller's family. The father was Abraham Popoff and mother Leena Kaisa Karppinen. Albin Savola started the Finnish Evangelical Lutheran Mission missionary school in 1890. From the school he was sent mission field, where he arrived in 1893. As a layman, Savola was assigned the task of developing cotton cultivation in Ovamboland and fabric production. Savola worked at the Oniipa missionary  station.

Albin Savola became engaged to Eedla Nikkinen. The fiancée to Ovamboland in 1896. The couple were married immediately upon arrival in Namibia. After the death of his wife, Savola returned to Finland in 1900. In Finland, he also married his late wife's sister Maria Nikkinen. Savola returned with his wife to Ovamboland where they had three children.

During his second term in Ovamboland, Savola set up the first printing house in Ovamboland, starting the publication of the Journal Osondaha on 15 October 1901. He also wrote the first biography of Martti Rautanen while staying in Ovamboland.

In 1908, Savola transferred to the, where he served as pastor of the Finnish Lutheran church in Michigan Covington. From there he returned to Finland in 1912. In Finland, he performed at the University of Theology degree and eventually work Forssa parish vicar until the end of his life.

Major works
Skoglund, GM & Alb. Savola (1903). Omahokololo gom 'Ombibeli: ga ńoolua. Helsinki.
Savola, Alb. (1908). Ošindongan grammar. Helsinki.
Savola, Alb. et al. (1914). Omahokololo gooramata pasindonga. Finnish Evangelical Lutheran Mission, Helsinki.
Savola, Alb. (1916). Ham's tents, or in ondonga and its people. Finnish Evangelical Lutheran Mission, Helsinki.
Savola, Alb. (1917). The black child's life for the children. Finnish Evangelical Lutheran Mission, Helsinki.
Savola, Alb. (1924). Ovamboland and its people. 2nd edition. Finnish Evangelical Lutheran Mission, Helsinki.
Savola, Alb. (1927). Martti Rautanen. Finnish Evangelical Lutheran Mission, Helsinki.
Savola, Alb. (1927). Martin Rautanen. Transl. Marta A. Renvall. Helsinki.

References

Sources

External links
 Forsius, Arno: Selma Rainio (1873–1939) – A Finnish Medical Missionary. 
 Helsinki University Museum: Selma Rainio. 
 Halmetoja, Henriikka Suvi-Tuulia:Medical Missionary Selma Rainio As A Representative of Western Culture and Medicine in Ovamboland in 1908–1938. 2008. 
 Vantaa City Museum: Kuku Selma Rainio (1873–1939). 
 When Selma Founded A Hospital. Vantaan Lauri, 15 January 2009.

1867 births
1934 deaths
People from Sulkava
People from Mikkeli Province (Grand Duchy of Finland)
Missionaries of the Finnish Missionary Society
Finnish Evangelical Lutheran Mission
Lutheran missionaries in Namibia
Christian medical missionaries
Finnish expatriates in Namibia